Amalie Mauthner ( Epstein; 1832 – 15 December 1915) was an Austro-Hungarian pianist and composer.

Biography
Mauthner was born in Pest to Jewish parents Zacharias and Theresia Mauthner. By the mid-1840s she had begun performing in concerts across Central Europe.

She married affluent Silesian merchant and amateur violinist Leopold Rawack in 1853, and the couple moved to Sydney amid the Australian gold rush. A daughter was born after three years of marriage, but died in infancy in February 1858. Mauthner took up work as a music teacher, joined the Sydney Philharmonic Society, and performed in several highly praised concerts as a soloist. Her only surviving composition, the waltz Novara-Klänge, was published in Germany in 1860 in celebration of the SMS Novora's visit to Australia.

By 1861 she and Rawack had divorced, and she returned to Vienna that February. She married pianist Julius Epstein in 1865, with whom she raised three children.

References

1832 births
1915 deaths
19th-century classical pianists
Austro-Hungarian Jews
Austro-Hungarian musicians
Women pianists
Austro-Hungarian emigrants to Australia
Jewish classical composers
Jewish women musicians
Jewish women composers
Jewish classical pianists
Jews and Judaism in Vienna
Musicians from Vienna
Composers from Vienna
Musicians from Sydney